David J. Smyth (26 July 1872 – 4 December 1954) was a member of the Pennsylvania House of Representatives in 1901–02.

He was described by Rudolph Blankenburg as having been dismissed as director of public safety in Philadelphia "for the good of the service".

References 

Members of the Pennsylvania House of Representatives
1872 births
1954 deaths